In 1997, it was purchased and reorganized by a group of former employees of Leitch Technology (now owned by Harris Corporation).

Evertz held an initial public offering in June 2006 and raised $67 million CAD, listing its stock on the Toronto Stock Exchange. In June, 2011, Evertz announced it would buy back as many as 3.8 million of its 74.47 million outstanding shares.

Evertz acquired router manufacturer Quartz Electronics in 2005  and software developer Pharos Communications in 2011. In 2018, Evertz acquired Quintech Electronics & Communication Inc., a manufacturer of RF switching products. In October 2020, Evertz acquired a Norwegian streaming and graphics software company Ease Live AS . On February 9, 2021, Evertz acquired the iconic Studer audio brand from HARMAN International.

Products, services and technology 
This section requires sourced content.

Awards 
In 2008, Evertz was awarded the Philo T. Farnsworth Corporate Achievement Award, which is a Primetime Emmy award given by the Academy of Television Arts & Sciences to honor companies which have significantly affected the state of television and broadcast engineering over a long period of time.

In 2016, the National Academy of Television Arts & Sciences (NATAS) awarded Evertz a Technology & Engineering Emmy Award for Live Production Technology Beyond HD to Achieve Non-Interpolated Video for Instant Replay in reference to its DreamCatcher product line. Additionally, in 2019, NATAS awarded Evertz a Technology & Engineering Emmy Award for Pioneering Public Cloud Based linear Media Supply Chains in reference to its Mediator-X, OvertureRT-LIVE, and Render-X products.

References 

Electronics companies of Canada
Companies based in Burlington, Ontario
Electronics companies established in 1966
1966 establishments in Ontario
Companies listed on the Toronto Stock Exchange
Video equipment manufacturers